Vynohradiv Raion was a raion of Zakarpattia Oblast in western Ukraine. Its administrative center was the city of Vynohradiv. The raion was abolished and its territory was merged into Berehove Raion on 18 July 2020 as part of the administrative reform of Ukraine, which reduced the number of raions of Zakarpattia Oblast to six.

Gallery

See also
 Administrative divisions of Zakarpattia Oblast

References

External links
 rajrada.sevlush.net 

Former raions of Zakarpattia Oblast
1953 establishments in Ukraine
Ukrainian raions abolished during the 2020 administrative reform